WBWO-LP is an Oldies formatted broadcast radio station licensed to Moundsville, West Virginia, serving Moundsville and Glen Dale in West Virginia and Shadyside in Ohio.  WBWO-LP is owned and operated by Grave Creek B'Nai Noach.

References

External links
 102.9 FM on Facebook
 

2014 establishments in West Virginia
Oldies radio stations in the United States
Radio stations established in 2014
BWO-LP
BWO-LP